Bill McIlvain (born August 28, 1932) is an American politician in the state of Wyoming. He served in the Wyoming House of Representatives as a member of the Republican Party.

He served as Speaker of the Wyoming House of Representatives from 1989 to 1991. He attended the University of Wyoming and John Brown University and is a former college instructor.

References

1939 births
Living people
People from Stephens County, Oklahoma
John Brown University alumni
University of Wyoming alumni
Educators from Wyoming
Republican Party members of the Wyoming House of Representatives
Speakers of the Wyoming House of Representatives
Politicians from Oklahoma